Li Lykke Timotej Zachrisson (born 18 March 1986), known as Lykke Li, is a Swedish singer, songwriter and actress. Her music often blends elements of indie pop, dream pop and electronic. Her debut studio album, Youth Novels, was released in 2008, and has been followed by Wounded Rhymes (2011), I Never Learn (2014), So Sad So Sexy (2018), and Eyeye (2022).

Early life
Li Lykke Timotej Zachrisson was born in Ystad, Skåne; her mother, was a photographer, and her father,  (stage name Zilverzurfarn), is a member of the Swedish punk-reggae band Dag Vag. Her younger brother, Zacharias Zachrisson ( Vacation Forever), is also a musician. The family moved to Stockholm when Zachrisson was a toddler and when she was six moved to a mountaintop in Portugal where they lived for five years. The family also spent time in Lisbon and Morocco, and winters in Nepal and India. She moved to Brooklyn, New York City, for three months when she was 19. She returned when she was 21 to record her album.

Career

2007–2010: Career beginnings and Youth Novels

Lykke Li released her first EP, Little Bit, in 2007. Stereogum named her an artist to watch in October 2007 and described her music as a mix of soul, electro and "powdered-sugar pop".
Li's debut album, Youth Novels, was released on LL Recordings in the Nordic region on 30January 2008 and received a wider European release in June 2008. The album was produced by Björn Yttling of Peter Bjorn and John and Lasse Mårtén and was reportedly inspired by a previous relationship of three years. It was released in the United States on 19August 2008. The album was released in the United Kingdom in June 2008, promoted by a performance of "Little Bit" on Later... with Jools Holland on 25May 2008.

Lykke Li performed live with a pared-down drum kit, a necklace made out of percussive instruments, a guitar, a bass and a microphone. Youth Novels was placed on many of the year's Best Of lists and saw Lykke Li sell out tours, including sets at festivals Glastonbury, Coachella and Lollapalooza. She appeared on Late Night with Conan O'Brien.

She appeared on Swedish musician Kleerup's self-titled album, contributing vocals to the track "Until We Bleed". She also worked with Norwegian electronic duo Röyksopp on their 2009 album Junior, contributing vocals to "Miss It So Much" and "Were You Ever Wanted". Lykke Li appeared on Last Call with Carson Daly on 18February 2009. She covered "Knocked Up", originally recorded by Kings of Leon who had approached Lykke to cover a song of her choice, and "Gifted" in which she performs with Kanye West. Lykke Li performed at the 2009 Coachella Valley Music and Arts Festival on 19April and the 2009 Lollapalooza festival on 8August as part of the promotional tour for Youth Novels.

Her song "I'm Good, I'm Gone" featured in the game FIFA 09, whilst a remixed version was featured in the 2009 horror film Sorority Row. The song "Possibility" was written for the 2009 film The Twilight Saga: New Moon. Lykke Li had been asked to write a song to the film soundtrack but was reluctant to commit to the project. It was after she had seen an early screening of the film that she decided she wanted to contribute to the soundtrack. The soundtrack was released on 16October 2009.

2011–2013: Wounded Rhymes

The song "Get Some" was featured in the 15th episode of the first season of Hawaii Five-0 titled "Kai e'e" which aired 23January 2011. The song was also used in ABC Family's drama Pretty Little Liars in the 18th episode of the second season which was titled "A Kiss Before Lying" which aired 30January 2012. The song was also used in the 19th episode of the second season of The CW's The Vampire Diaries, titled "Klaus" and originally aired 21April 2011, and in the show Don't Trust the B---- in Apartment 23 as well as the sixth episode of the first season of Teen Wolf, titled "Heart Monitor" and originally aired 4July 2011. The song was also used in the film Premium Rush as one of its soundtracks. The song "Unrequited Love" was used in episode 19 ("The Wheels of Justice"), season four of The Good Wife.

Li's song "Melodies and Desires" was featured in the 2010 Australian film Griff the Invisible and an edited version of "Get Some" was featured in the Catwoman trailer for the video game, Batman: Arkham City. She collaborated with singer Kleerup on the song "Until We Bleed", which was featured on an episode of UK TV series Misfits and an episode of the television series Ringer.

Her second album Wounded Rhymes was released in 2011. The album was featured on several lists of 2011's best albums, including Q, Mojo, The Observer, The New York Times, The Huffington Post and Rolling Stone. The 19April 2011 episode of Glee (titled "A Night of Neglect") featured student Tina singing a version of Li's "I Follow Rivers". On 30April 2011, she performed on Later... with Jools Holland in the UK, playing "Get Some", "Sadness Is a Blessing" and "I Follow Rivers". Lykke Li played at the 2011 Latitude Festival, held between 14 and 18July 2011 at Henham Park in Suffolk, England. She appeared with her band on US late night talk show The Tonight Show with Jay Leno in August 2011 and on the Late Show with David Letterman in November 2011.

Belgian DJ/producer The Magician's remix of "I Follow Rivers" is featured in Jacques Audiard's 2012 film Rust and Bone and the 2013 Palme d'Or-winning Blue Is the Warmest Colour. Lykke  contributed to the 2012 compilation "Volym 1" with the track "Come Near" released by the Swedish artist collective and record label INGRID where she is a founding member. She also contributed a cover of "Silver Springs" to a 2012 Fleetwood Mac tribute album, which included renditions from Best Coast, Marianne Faithfull, and MGMT.

In 2013, she was featured as a guest musician on David Lynch's second studio album, The Big Dream, performing vocals on the lead single, "I'm Waiting Here".

2014–2017: I Never Learn, acting debut and Liv

On 27February 2014, Lykke Li released the video for the title track of her third studio album, I Never Learn. Following the release, Lykke Li released the video for the single "Love Me Like I'm Not Made of Stone" on 4March 2014. On 10April 2014, she released a video for the lead single, "No Rest for the Wicked". On 15 July 2014, she also released a video for the single "Gunshot".

Lykke Li officially released I Never Learn on 2May 2014. Once again her album was featured on several lists of 2014's best albums, including Billboard, Complex, and Pitchfork, among others. In United States, I Never Learn debuted at number 29 on the Billboard 200, making it Li's highest-peaking album on the chart. Prior to the release, Lykke Li released a remix of "No Rest for the Wicked", featuring ASAP Rocky, on 21 April 2014. On 30 May 2014, Lykke Li released a remix EP of "No Rest for the Wicked". German electronic DJ Robin Schulz remixed "No Rest for the Wicked" and the edit was featured in Schulz's debut album Prayer.

Lykke Li made her acting debut in the 2014 Swedish crime film Tommy, directed by Tarik Saleh, and recorded a song for the film, "Du är den ende". She wrote "No One Ever Loved" for the soundtrack to The Fault in Our Stars, which was released on 19May 2014. Lykke Li was also featured as a guest musician on U2's album Songs of Innocence, performing vocals on the last track "The Troubles".

On 14November 2014, Lykke Li gained considerable attention from Internet music publications regarding her cover of Drake's "Hold On, We're Going Home", performed the night prior at London's Eventim Apollo. On 5January 2015, Lykke Li posted a picture on her Instagram account, in which she announced her temporary retirement.

In 2015, Lykke Li was featured on Emile Haynie's debut album We Fall on the track "Come Find Me", which also features Romy Madley Croft from The xx. She also teamed up with Woodkid to create a song for the Divergent Series: Insurgent – Original Motion Picture Soundtrack. The song, "Never Let You Down", was released as a single on 9March 2015.

On 6April 2015, she released a video for "Never Gonna Love Again", directed by Philippe Tempelman. In September 2016, supergroup Liv, featuring Lykke Li, released their first single "Wings of Love". The music video was directed by Lykke Li.

2018–2019: So Sad So Sexy

Lykke Li released her fourth studio album, So Sad So Sexy, on 8 June 2018 through RCA. Along with the announcement, Lykke Li released the first two singles, "Deep End" and "Hard Rain".

In April 2019, she sang lead vocals and appeared in the video for Mark Ronson's "Late Night Feelings", the title track from the album of the same name.

In July 2019, Lykke Li released the EP Still Sad Still Sexy, featuring four remixes from So Sad So Sexy and two new songs.

2020–present: Eyeye

In a 2019 interview speaking about her fifth studio album, Lykke Li told NME: "I think, maybe to everyone's disappointment, I'm going to really scale it down and back and slow it down. [...] It'll be more like soul music. It'll still be sad, and still be sexy."

Lykke Li made her return to music releasing "Bron", a song sung entirely in Swedish, in October 2020.

Lykke Li released "No Hotel", the lead single from her fifth studio album, Eyeye, on 23 March 2022. The album was released on 20 May 2022.

In July 2022, it was announced that Li would partner with creative director Theo Lindquist and artist Nick Verstandpresent to present an immersive installation, entitled Ü & EYEYE, at Los Angeles' The Broad Museum. The project intends "to transform the Broad’s Oculus Hall into a hyper-sensory cathedral of female romantic fantasy", says a statement released about the installation. The opening night will feature a special performance by Li and her band in the Broad's lobby and third floor galleries.

Other ventures
In September 2010, Lykke Li was announced as the official face of the Levi's Curve ID Collection, alongside Pixie Geldof and Miss Nine. In January 2012 she signed with the VIVA Model Management agency.

Lykke Li made her acting debut in the 2014 Swedish crime film Tommy directed by Tarik Saleh. The film was released in cinemas in Scandinavia in March 2014. Lykke Li also stars in Terrence Malick's film Song to Song released in 2017. She plays BV's (Ryan Gosling) girlfriend.

The song "Gunshot" was used in the television commercial for the Peugeot 108, which stars Li. She also stars in a short film for Gucci's Spring/Summer 2015 collection, which features the song "Just Like a Dream" and debuted on 2March 2015.

Artistry
Lykke Li has cited Neil Young, the Shangri-Las, This Mortal Coil, the Beatles, and The Rolling Stones as influences, stating, "They aren't pop anymore by today's standards, but they were." Other influences include the Velvet Underground, Leonard Cohen, and Beach House.

Lykke Li possesses the vocal range of a soprano.

Personal life
Of her practice of transcendental meditation, Lykke Li said in 2014: "It's really interesting from a creative point of view. Before, I could only write a few sentences and I'd have to take a break for a few days before I could go back to it. All of a sudden, I could write and finish a song in one go – verse, verse, verse, chorus, the lot. And that would happen with song after song. Finally, I unlocked the gate."

On 30October 2015, Lykke Li posted a photo on Instagram announcing her pregnancy. On 12 February 2016, she announced the birth of her son Dion, whose father is musician Jeff Bhasker, on Facebook. Her mother died three weeks after Dion was born; she says that her album So Sad So Sexy was born out of this difficult time in her life.

Discography

 Youth Novels (2008)
 Wounded Rhymes (2011)
 I Never Learn (2014)
 So Sad So Sexy (2018)
 Eyeye (2022)

Filmography

 Tommy (2014)
 Song to Song (2017)

Awards and nominations
{| class="wikitable sortable plainrowheaders" 
|-
! scope="col" | Award
! scope="col" | Year
! scope="col" | Nominee(s)
! scope="col" | Category
! scope="col" | Result
! scope="col" class="unsortable"| 
|-
! scope="row" rowspan=5|Antville Music Video Awards
| rowspan=3|2008
| rowspan=3|"I'm Good, I'm Gone"
| Best Performance Video
| 
| rowspan=3|
|-
| Best Choreography
| 
|-
| Best Art Direction
| 
|-
| rowspan=2|2011
| rowspan=2|"Sadness Is a Blessing"
| Best Narrative
| 
| rowspan=2|
|-
| Best Cinematography
| 
|-
!scope="row"|BT Digital Music Awards
| 2011
| Wounded Rhymes Google Earth Moon gig
| Best Artist Promotion
| 
| 
|-
!scope="row"|Camerimage
|2018
| "Hard Rain"
| Best Music Video
| 
| 
|-
!scope="row"|ECHO Awards
| 2012
| "I Follow Rivers"
| Hit of the Year
| 
| 
|-
!scope="row"|European Border Breakers Awards
| 2009
| Youth Novels
| Album of the Year
| 
| 
|-
!scope="row"|European Festivals Awards
| 2012
| "I Follow Rivers" 
| Festival Anthem of the Year
| 
| 
|-
!scope="row" rowspan=2|GAFFA Awards (Denmark)
| rowspan=2|2019
| Herself
| Best International Artist
| 
|-
| So Sad So Sexy
| Best International Album
| 
|-
!scope="row" rowspan=3|GAFFA Awards (Sweden)
| rowspan=3|2019
| rowspan=1|Herself
| Best Solo Artist
| 
|-
| "Deep End"
| Best Hit
| 
|-
| So Sad So Sexy
| Best Album
| 
|-
!scope="row" rowspan=10|Grammis
| 2009
| rowspan=5|Herself
| Best Newcomer
| 
| 
|-
| rowspan=5|2012
| Best Pop
| 
| rowspan=5|
|-
| Best Composer
| 
|-
| Best International Success
| 
|-
| Best Artist 
| 
|-
| Wounded Rhymes
| Best Album
| 
|-
| 2015
| rowspan=3|Herself
| Best Pop
| 
| 
|-
| rowspan=3|2019
| Best Alternative Pop
| 
| rowspan=3|
|-
| Best Composer
| 
|-
| So Sad So Sexy
| Best Album
| 
|-
!scope="row"|mtvU Woodie Awards
| 2008
| Herself
| The Breaking Woodie 
| 
| 
|-
!scope="row"|Meteor Music Awards
| 2009
| Herself
| Best International Female
| 
| 
|-
!scope="row"|NME Awards
| 2009
| Herself
| Hottest Female
| 
| 
|-
!scope="row" rowspan=2|Nordic Music Prize
| 2011
| Wounded Rhymes
| rowspan=2|Album of the Year
| 
| 
|-
| 2014
| I Never Learn
| 
| 
|-
!scope="row" rowspan=3|P3 Guld Music Awards
| rowspan=2|2009
| rowspan=3|Herself
| rowspan=1|Best New Artist
| 
| rowspan=2|
|-
| rowspan=2|Best Pop
| 
|-
| 2015
| 
| 
|-
!scope="row" rowspan=6|Rober Awards Music Prize
| rowspan=2|2008
| rowspan=5|Herself
| Best European Artist
| 
| 
|-
| rowspan=3|Best Female Artist
| 
| 
|-
| 2011
| 
| 
|-
| rowspan=3|2014
| 
| rowspan=3|
|-
| Best Pop Artist
| 
|-
| "Du är den ende"
| Best Cover Version
| 
|-
!scope="row"|Studio8 Media International Music Awards
| 2009
| Herself
| Female Voice of February 2009
| 
| 
|-
!scope="row" rowspan=2|UK Music Video Awards
| 2019
| "Late Night Feelings" 
| Best Styling in a Video
| 
| 
|-
| 2022
| Eyeye
| Best Special Video Project
| 
| 
|-
!scope="row" rowspan=4|World Music Awards
| rowspan=4|2014
| rowspan=3|Herself
| World's Best Female Artist
| 
| rowspan=1|
|-
|World's Best Live Act
| 
| 
|-
| World's Best Entertainer of the Year
| 
| 
|-
| "I Follow Rivers"
| World's Best Song
| 
|

References

External links

 
 
 

1986 births
Living people
21st-century Swedish singers
Art pop musicians
Atlantic Records artists
English-language singers from Sweden
Swedish women singer-songwriters
Swedish indie pop musicians
Musicians from Stockholm
People from Ystad Municipality
RCA Records artists
Swedish electronic musicians
Swedish expatriates in Portugal
Swedish expatriates in the United States
Swedish female models
Swedish film actresses
Swedish pop singers
Swedish singer-songwriters
Swedish sopranos
Synth-pop singers
Swedish women in electronic music
21st-century Swedish women singers
Swedish people of Baltic German descent
Swedish people of Scottish descent